Selalmaz is a village in the Daday District of Kastamonu Province in Turkey. Its population is 105 (2021).

References

Villages in Daday District